Rooma Mehra (born 24 January 1967) is an Indian poet, painter, sculptor, freelance newspaper writer and a columnist for the Indian Express.

Career
Mehra is a self-taught artist with a social conscience, who has had 11 solo shows of her paintings, reliefs and sculptures. Her artworks are found in private and permanent collections including the National Gallery of Modern Art New Delhi, Lalit Kala Akademi New Delhi, Arte Antica Gallery, Canada, and individual collections in Switzerland, the US, Denmark, Austria the UK, Spain, the U.A.E. and Japan. Mehra's art has been referred to as a new art.

She expresses humanitarianism in her works of art as well as her writing. Mehra has done voluntary teaching work for the sight-impaired at the Blind Relief Association and the SOS Children's Villages of India (Christian Children's Fund).

A compilation of her newspaper travel articles was translated by Mehra into the German language and published digitally, entitled Das ausländische Stück des Grases in 2008.

Mehra currently lives and works in Los Angeles, California.

Selected publications
She has written three books of poetry:

Sunshadow, Writers Workshop, 1981
'Reaching Out' (1985), Sagar Printers and Publishers, New Delhi2 34
'For You'' (1986) Selectbook Service Syndicate, 1986 – 30 pages

See also 
 List of Indian writers

References

External links
Official Website

Indian women poets
Indian women contemporary artists
Indian contemporary painters
1967 births
Living people
Indian women painters
Indian women sculptors
20th-century Indian painters
20th-century Indian women artists
20th-century Indian poets
Women writers from Delhi
20th-century Indian women writers
Women artists from Delhi
Indian women columnists
Indian columnists
Indian contemporary sculptors
21st-century Indian women artists